Kevin Murphy (born July 4, 1965) is a former American football lineman who played two seasons in the Arena Football League with the New England Steamrollers and Albany Firebirds. Murphy played college football at Boston University and attended West Genesee High School in Camillus, New York.

Early years
Murphy played high school football for the West Genesee High School Wildcats. He also participated in wrestling for the Wildcats.

College career
Murphy played college football for the Boston University Terriers. He earned NCAA Division I-AA All-American and Yankee Conference Defensive Player of the Year honors as a defensive tackle in 1986. He also earned First Team All-Yankee Conference honors in 1986. Murphy was inducted into Boston University's Scarlet Key Society in 1990.

Professional career
Murphy played for the New England Steamrollers in 1988, earning Second Team All-Arena honors. He played for the Albany Firebirds in 1990, garnering First Team All-Arena recognition.

References

External links
Just Sports Stats

Living people
1965 births
Players of American football from Syracuse, New York
American football offensive linemen
American football defensive linemen
Boston University Terriers football players
New England Steamrollers players
Albany Firebirds players
People from Camillus, New York